The Covenant First Presbyterian Church is a congregation of the Presbyterian Church (USA) located at 717 Elm Street at Eighth Street and Garfield Place in Cincinnati, Ohio. Two churches, the First Presbyterian and Covenant Presbyterian merged in the 1933 to become the Covenant First Presbyterian Church.

The first Presbyterian Church in Cincinnati was on the north side of Fourth Street near Main and was organized October 16, 1790.

History
Covenant-First Presbyterian is the heir of the heritage of both First Presbyterian, Cincinnati and Covenant Presbyterian (formerly Second Presbyterian of Cincinnati).

First Presbyterian was organized October 16, 1790, the first pastor being James Kemper.  Kemper's log cabin is preserved in Sharon Woods Park in Sharonville, OH.  Second Presbyterian grew out of First Presbyterian in 1816.   After moving to various locations in downtown Cincinnati, Second Presbyterian settled into the present location at the corner of 8th and Elm streets.   Dr Henry van Dyke preached the sermon for the dedication of the sanctuary on April 11, 1875.

In 1833, Lyman Beecher was called as pastor of Second Presbyterian and president of Lane Theological Seminary.  During his tenure in town, he had a falling out with Joshua Lacy Wilson, the pastor of First Presbyterian.  Wilson eventually charged Beecher with heresy.  Though Beecher was acquitted by the higher governing bodies of the church, his ministry was compromised, and he left in 1843.  A memorial plaque to Dr. Beecher is in the bell tower of Covenant-First Presbyterian.   On the other side of the building, the church has a portrait of Joshua Lacy Wilson.  Though the rift between First and Second presbyterian churches was healed in the merger that created Covenant-First, the feuding pastors remain on opposite ends of the facilities.

Church facility
The present Church building was dedicated April 11, 1875. It was designed by Cincinnati architect, William Walter.  The Gothic style church was constructed, facing Piatt Park, of handcut stone from the quarries of church member Colonel Peter Rudolph Neff. The belfry remains as originally constructed and contains a huge bell bearing the old inscription in bold relief, "Revere, Boston."  The unusual interior arrangement is said to have its origin in the seventeenth-century Gothic tithing -barns of the Scottish-English border country.  The pulpit furniture was carved from black walnut by Henry L. Fry.

On January 29, 1973, the church's historic building was added to the National Register of Historic Places.

List of recent pastors
Rev. Frank Elder; 1928–1950
Rev. Paul Ketchum (AP); 1940–1942
Rev. J. Louis Crandall (AP); 1943–1944
Rev. Hodson Young (AP); 1944–1945
Rev. John McLeod (AP); 1945–1953
Rev. Irvin Yeaworth; 1950–1967
Rev. S. Allen Catalin (AP); 1957–1960
Rev. Harold Russell; 1967–1984
Rev. Robert Strain (AP); 1973–1974
Rev. Peter J. Fosburg; 1984–1994
Rev. Russell Smith; 2001–2020
Rev. Nathaniel M. Wright (AP); 2008–2013

References

External links
Covenant-First Presbyterian Church
Covenant First Presbyterian Church

Presbyterian Church (USA) churches
Presbyterian churches in Ohio
Presbyterian churches in Cincinnati
National Register of Historic Places in Cincinnati
Cincinnati Local Historic Landmarks